Daniel Padilla started his acting career in television as Daniel Ledesma in Gimik 2010, before landing the lead role Patrick Rivero in Growing Up (2011). Padilla finally starred in a critically acclaimed prime-time television series Princess and I (2012-2013), and garnering further recognition for appearing alongside Kathryn Bernardo in Got to Believe (2013-2014). Padilla began transition to more adult roles as Angelo Buenavista in ABS-CBN top seller international distribution program, remake of Pangako Sa 'Yo (2015). The role earned him first nomination at the 2015 PMPC Star Awards for Best Actor. All of his soap operas listed as the most watch Filipino television programs.

Padilla debut as a movie actor as Billy Fernandez in 24/7 in Love (2012) co-start with Kathryn Bernardo (known as "KathNiel"). The role earned him nomination at the 2013 PMPC Star Awards for New Movie Actor of the Year. In the same year he was also cast as Angelo Santos in blockbuster film Sisterakas (2012). Padilla first starred in Must Be... Love (2013). In the same year he starred in Metro Manila Film Festival entry, supernatural horror film Pagpag: Siyam na Buhay (2013) directed by Frasco S. Mortiz. Grossed P23.7M on its first day of showing, with total Box-Office Gross P182,750,969 made the movie at No.6 of Star Cinema top-grossing MMFF entries from 2009 to 2013 Earned him nomination at the 2013 Metro Manila Film Festival and 2014 FAMAS Awards for Best Actor and Young Critics Circle for Best Performance. Padilla has starred in blockbuster film including She's Dating the Gangster (2014), Crazy Beautiful You (2015), all his film rank among the highest-grossing Philippines films and earned him award at the GMMSF Box-Office Entertainment Awards for Prince of Philippine Movies and PEP Choice Awards Male Movie Star of the Year three years in a row. His role as Ely Antonio in Barcelona: A Love Untold (2016) earned him Box Office Entertainment Award for Box Office King, PMPC Star Award for Movie Actor of the Year and FAMAS Award for Best Actor when he was 22 years old, made him one of the youngest awardee.

In 2017 Padilla starred in the television drama La Luna Sangre, Can't Help Falling in Love and Gandarrapiddo: The Revenger Squad as Tristan, Dos and Rapiddo respectively.

Filmography

Dramas

Films

Online series

References

Filmographies
Padilla, Daniel